Peggy L. Fenton (October 12, 1927 – June 16, 2013) played for the Muskegon Lassies and the South Bend Blue Sox of the All-American Girls Professional Baseball League during the 1948 season. She batted and threw left-handed.

She later was a longtime employee of BP Amoco Oil, retiring as Master Chief after 26 years of service in both the United States Marines and Naval Reserves.

References

1927 births
2013 deaths
All-American Girls Professional Baseball League players
Muskegon Lassies players
South Bend Blue Sox players
Baseball players from Illinois
People from Forest Park, Illinois
21st-century American women